Franciscans are members - Friars Minor - of the Order of Friars Minor, a Catholic religious order founded in 1209 by Francis of Assisi.

It may sometimes refer to other Catholic organisations adhering to the Rule of Saint Francis or his spirituality, including non-Catholic organisations allegedly inspired by those.

Catholic religious orders
The following are the main Franciscan religious orders within the Catholic Church there are in fact many more to numerous to list here
 Order of Friars Minor, founded in 1209 by St Francis of Assisi
 Order of Saint Clare, founded in 1212 by St Clare and St Francis of Assisi
 Secular Franciscan Order, founded in 1221 by St Francis of Assisi
 Order of Friars Minor Conventual founded in 1517 by secession from Order of Friars Minor
 Order of Friars Minor Capuchin founded in 1520 by secession from Order of Friars Minor

Non-Catholic organisations

Anglicanism
 Society of St Francis, founded in 1934
Community of St. Francis, founded in 1905
Community of St. Clare, founded in 1950
Little Brothers of Francis, founded in 1987

Lutheranism
Order of Lutheran Franciscans, founded after 1927

Ecumenical
 Order of Ecumenical Franciscans, founded in 1983